Wertz's Covered Bridge, also known as the Red Covered Bridge, is a historic wooden covered bridge located at Bern Township and Spring Township in Berks County, Pennsylvania.

It crosses the Tulpehocken Creek. It serves as the walkway entrance to the Berks County Heritage Center, which also includes the Gruber Wagon Works. It is one of five covered bridges remaining in Berks County. It is the largest single-span covered bridge in Pennsylvania.

The bridge was rehabilitated in 1959 from 10 April to 3 August, however, when the Warren Street Bypass opened the bridge was closed permanently on 23 October 1959. It was listed on the National Register of Historic Places on 17 November 1978. From June until December 1984 the bridge was restored. The siding was replaced, several floor boards were replaced, it was jacked up, realigned, tightened, camber restored, and the rotted arch ends were replaced along with cedar roof shingles.

References

External links
Berks County Heritage Center
Berks County Covered Bridges

Covered bridges on the National Register of Historic Places in Pennsylvania
Covered bridges in Berks County, Pennsylvania
Bridges completed in 1867
Wooden bridges in Pennsylvania
Bridges in Berks County, Pennsylvania
1867 establishments in Pennsylvania
National Register of Historic Places in Berks County, Pennsylvania
Road bridges on the National Register of Historic Places in Pennsylvania
Burr Truss bridges in the United States